In mathematics, particularly the study of Lie groups, a Dunkl operator is a certain kind of mathematical operator, involving differential operators but also reflections in an underlying space.

Formally, let G be a Coxeter group with reduced root system R and kv an arbitrary "multiplicity" function on R (so ku = kv whenever the reflections σu and σv corresponding to the roots u and v are conjugate in G). Then, the Dunkl operator is defined by:

where  is the i-th component of v,  1 ≤ i ≤ N, x in RN, and f a smooth function on RN.

One of Dunkl's major results was that Dunkl operators "commute," that is, they satisfy  just as partial derivatives do. Thus Dunkl operators represent a meaningful generalization of partial derivatives.

References

Lie groups